Pureland origami is a style of origami invented by the British paper folder John Smith that is limited to using only mountain and valley folds. The aim of Pureland origami is to make origami easier for inexperienced folders and those who have impaired motor skills. This means that many, but not all, of the more complicated processes that are common in regular origami, are impossible; and so alternative manipulations have been developed to create similar effects.

See also 
 Origami
 Origami techniques

External links 
 Some Thoughts on Minimal Folding by John Smith in Bits of Smith.
 FOLDS.NET - Some diagrams of pureland origami.
 The Origami Interest Group - Three pureland diagrams. (archived 2011)

Origami